Pakerai (Samogitian: Pakerā) is a village in the Plungė district municipality, to the south from Plungė.

As of 2011, there were 154 inhabitants living in this village.

References

Villages in Telšiai County
Plungė District Municipality